

The Drowning Girl: A Memoir is a 2012 novel by American writer Caitlín R. Kiernan, set in Providence, Rhode Island. The story's protagonist and unreliable narrator, India Morgan Phelps (also known as Imp), has schizophrenia.

It has been described as an "eerie masterpiece of literary horror and dark fantasy" containing elements of magical realism. It has also been described as semi-autobiographical. The novel has been translated into a number of languages, including French, German, Polish, Portuguese, Spanish, Romanian, and Turkish.

Synopsis

The Drowning Girl follows the story of India Morgan Phelps, an unreliable narrator struggling with hereditary mental illness. 
India states that she has decided to write down the bizarre events that occurred two years ago (the entirety of the novel is written as a fictionalized memoir). Early in the novel, she befriends her eventual roommate and lover, a transgender woman named Abalyn Armitage. India works at an art supply store, but she is also a painter and a writer.

One night, India picks up a hitchhiker named Eva Canning, whom she finds stranded and naked on the side of the road, although India is unable to pinpoint whether she met Eva in July or November. Eva stays with India only for a short while (much to Abalyn's chagrin) before the mysterious woman takes off on her own, but apparently continues to stalk India. This sparks India's obsession with Canning and her past. India's obsession eventually causes Abalyn to leave her. 

India often deals with traumatic events by writing short stories. Some of them relate to Eva Canning, while others revolve around a mysterious  artists Phillip George Saltonstall and Albert Perrault, as well as a painting titled "The Drowning Girl," which India saw on display at a museum as a child.

After running into Abalyn and her new girlfriend, India begins to lose her grasp on what is real and what isn't. As a result of her inability to tell fact from fiction, her growing obsession with Eva Canning, and Abalyn's abandonment, India suffers a mental breakdown. India stops taking her medication, stops eating, and neglects phone calls from concerned people such as Abalyn, her therapist, her boss (who fires her), and her aunt. India begins to paint and write obsessively until Abalyn finds her half-dead in her apartment.

With the help of Abalyn, India discovers that Eva Canning's mother (also named Eva)  was part of a cult lead by a woman known as Jacova Anjevine, who committed mass suicide with her followers by walking into the sea some years prior. Eva was apparently the only survivor of said mass suicide. India believes that Eva might be a ghost or a sea-dwelling creature of some sort in a human disguise, but the story is vague as to whether India actually encounters any supernatural phenomena.

India eventually does meet Eva Canning, and the two have a bizarre sexual encounter during which Canning appears to morph into a fish-like creature. Eva confesses to India that she wishes to go to the sea to be with her mother, which India obliges by taking her to the beach, at which point Eva walks into the water. India sits on the shore for a long time.

India reunites with Abalyn, and it is implied they are still together at the end of the novel. Eva's body washes up on the shore sometime after.

Awards

Won
James Tiptree, Jr. Award 
Bram Stoker Award for Superior Achievement in a Novel

Nominated
Nebula Award for Best Novel 
Locus Award for Best Fantasy Novel (finalist)
Shirley Jackson Award—Novel
Mythopoeic Fantasy Award for Adult Literature
British Fantasy Award – Novel
World Fantasy Award for Best Novel

See also
 Mental illness in fiction

References

American science fiction novels
Dark fantasy novels
2012 American novels
2012 LGBT-related literary works
Fiction with unreliable narrators
James Tiptree Jr. Award-winning works
Novels set in Providence, Rhode Island
LGBT speculative fiction novels
American LGBT novels
Novels with transgender themes
2010s LGBT novels
Works by Caitlín R. Kiernan
LGBT-related horror literature
Weird fiction novels
Roc Books books
Bram Stoker Award for Novel winners